Danilo Gabriel de Andrade (born 11 June 1979), known as Danilo, professional football coach and former player who manages the Corinthians U20 squad. He is considered by pundits to be the greatest player who was never called up to the Brazil national team.

Born in Minas Gerais, Danilo was an attacking midfielder who usually played in a playmaker's role. He was known for his technique, vision and goalscoring abilities, which earned him the nickname Zidanilo, in homage to Zinedine Zidane. He made over 450 appearances in a 20-year playing career, during which he was mainly associated with São Paulo and Corinthians. He twice won the Copa Libertadores and the FIFA Club World Cup, as is a four-time Brazilian league champion.

Coaching career
In January 2021, Danilo was appointed as Corinthians' new U23 coach.

Club statistics

State League

FIFA Club World Cup

Honours

Team
Goiás
Campeonato Brasileiro Série B: 1999
Campeonato Goiano: 1999, 2000, 2001, 2003
Copa Centro-Oeste: 2000, 2001, 2002

São Paulo
Campeonato Brasileiro Série A: 2006
Campeonato Paulista: 2005
Copa Libertadores: 2005
FIFA Club World Cup: 2005

Kashima Antlers
J. League Division 1: 2007, 2008, 2009
Emperor's Cup: 2007
Japanese Super Cup: 2009

Corinthians
Campeonato Brasileiro Série A: 2011, 2015, 2017
Campeonato Paulista: 2013, 2017, 2018
Copa Libertadores: 2012
Recopa Sudamericana: 2013
FIFA Club World Cup: 2012

References

External links

1979 births
Living people
Brazilian expatriate footballers
Brazilian footballers
Goiás Esporte Clube players
São Paulo FC players
Kashima Antlers players
Sport Club Corinthians Paulista players
Campeonato Brasileiro Série A players
J1 League players
Copa Libertadores-winning players
Expatriate footballers in Japan

Association football midfielders